Laurence Gilman (born January 6, 1965, in Winnipeg, Manitoba) is a Canadian ice hockey executive for the Toronto Maple Leafs. Currently, he serves as an assistant general manager of the Toronto Maple Leafs in the National Hockey League and is the Senior Vice President of their American Hockey League affiliate, the Toronto Marlies. He is the former assistant general manager of the Vancouver Canucks of the National Hockey League (NHL).

Prior to joining the Canucks, Gilman was employed for 13 years by the Winnipeg Jets/Phoenix Coyotes organization, including stints as the team's assistant general manager and general manager of the San Antonio Rampage of the American Hockey League.

On July 2, 2015, he was fired from the Vancouver Canucks.

References

External links
Laurence Gilman's profile at Eliteprospects

1965 births
Living people
Arizona Coyotes executives
Ice hockey people from Winnipeg
Vancouver Canucks executives